Lars Kirkebjerg (born 2 October 1922) was a Danish equestrian. He competed in two events at the 1956 Summer Olympics. Lars's father, Frode Rasmussen Kirkebjerg, was also an Olympian. He won the silver medal for Equestrianism in 1924.

References

External links
 

1922 births
Possibly living people
Danish male equestrians
Olympic equestrians of Denmark
Equestrians at the 1956 Summer Olympics
Sportspeople from Frederiksberg